Kim Chaek Iron & Steel Works is the largest steel mill in North Korea, named after national independence hero and military official Kim Chaek. It is located in Songpyong-guyok, Chongjin, North Hamgyŏng Province. It was established by Nippon Steel during the Japanese occupation of Korea and was nationalised after the establishment of the DPRK. It is known as "The Great Metallurgical Base of the North (북방의 대야금기지)". It has fifty thousand employees.

The facility is served by the Korean State Railway via Songpyung Station.

References

Steel companies of North Korea